Ana María Díaz Ríos (born 26 August 2002) is an American-raised Puerto Rican footballer who plays as a midfielder for the Georgia State Panthers and the Puerto Rico women's national team.

Early life
Díaz was raised in Johns Creek, Georgia.

References

2002 births
Living people
Women's association football midfielders
Puerto Rican women's footballers
Puerto Rico women's international footballers
Soccer players from Georgia (U.S. state)
Sportspeople from Fulton County, Georgia
American sportspeople of Puerto Rican descent
Georgia State Panthers women's soccer players